Dickinson is a city in and the county seat of Stark County, North Dakota, United States. The population was 25,679 at the 2020 census. Dickinson is home to the Ukrainian Cultural Institute, which has a museum and holds events year round for the local Ukrainian community. Western North Dakota has a high concentration of people of Ukrainian descent.

Since the North Dakota oil boom the city has become one of the fastest-growing cities in the United States. According to the 2020 census, the city is estimated to have a population of 25,679, however, other sources have estimates of the population at 33,646 or possibly exceeding 35,000. The rapid growth of the city led to an increase in crime and homelessness within the city limits.

Dickinson is the principal city of the Dickinson Micropolitan Statistical Area, a micropolitan area that covers Billings and Stark counties and had a combined population of 34,591 at the 2010 census.

History

Dickinson was founded in 1881. Dickinson was named for its founder, W. S. Dickinson, a native of Malone, New York.

Geography
Dickinson is located at  (46.883575, −102.788811).

Dickinson's municipal water supplies come from Southwest Water Authority which, in turn, gets their water from Lake Sakakawea through a transmission pipeline.

Climate
Nearly all of Stark County has a humid continental climate of warm summer (Köppen: Dfb), but due to low precipitation and marginality between climate with monsoon-influenced dry winter (Dwb) and semi-arid climate (BSk), Dickinson can be said to be prone to periods of drought, even though it is defined as wet all year round. Its climate is similar to Bismarck's, though a bit less extreme. The average window for freezing temperatures is September 22 thru May 16 and for measurable (≥) snow, October 26 thru April 19. Due to the relative aridity, there are only 2.8 days where 24-hour snowfall exceeds .

Demographics

2010 census
As of the census of 2010, there were 17,787 people, 7,521 households, and 4,308 families residing in the city. The racial makeup of the city was 94.2% White, 1.0% African American, 1.2% Native American, 1.5% Asian, 0.1% Pacific Islander, 0.6% from other races, and 1.5% from two or more races. Hispanic or Latino of any race were 2.1% of the population. It is estimated Dickinson has currently grown close to 35,000 people, due to the boom of the Bakken Oil Shale

There were 7,521 households, of which 26.6% had children under the age of 18 living with them, 45.4% were married couples living together, 8.1% had a female householder with no husband present, 3.9% had a male householder with no wife present, and 42.7% were non-families. 33.6% of all households were made up of individuals, and 12.8% had someone living alone who was 65 years of age or older. The average household size was 2.25 and the average family size was 2.89.

The median age in the city was 35.6 years. 21% of residents were under the age of 18; 14.1% were between the ages of 18 and 24; 24.6% were from 25 to 44; 24.3% were from 45 to 64; and 16.1% were 65 years of age or older. The gender makeup of the city was 49.3% male and 50.7% female.

2000 census
As of the census of 2000, there were 16,010 people, 6,517 households, and 4,020 families residing in the city. The population density was 1,690.7 inhabitants per square mile (652.7/km2). There were 7,033 housing units at an average density of 742.7 per square mile (286.7/km2). The racial makeup of the city was 97.16% White, 0.27% African American, 1.20% Native American, 0.24% Asian, 0.03% Pacific Islander, 0.32% from other races, and 0.77% from two or more races. Hispanic or Latino of any race were 1.05% of the population.

The top 6 ancestry groups in the city are German (54.1%), Norwegian (14.2%), Czech (7.5%), Russian (7.2%), Irish (5.5%), English (3.7%).

There were 6,517 households, out of which 30.9% had children under the age of 18 living with them, 49.7% were married couples living together, 9.1% had a female householder with no husband present, and 38.3% were non-families. 32.4% of all households were made up of individuals, and 13.3% had someone living alone who was 65 years of age or older. The average household size was 2.33 and the average family size was 2.99.

In the city, the population was spread out, with 24.5% under the age of 18, 13.8% from 18 to 24, 25.9% from 25 to 44, 19.8% from 45 to 64, and 16.1% who were 65 years of age or older. The median age was 36 years. For every 100 females, there were 93.5 males. For every 100 females age 18 and over, there were 88.7 males.

The median income for a household in the city was $31,542, and the median income for a family was $41,566. Males had a median income of $30,613 versus $19,951 for females. The per capita income for the city was $15,975. About 7.1% of families and 12.0% of the population were below the poverty line, including 10.2% of those under age 18 and 16.9% of those age 65 or over.

Education

K–12

The Dickinson Public Schools system includes six elementary schools, a junior high school, Dickinson High School and an alternative high school. There are also several parochial schools in Dickinson. Trinity East and Trinity West serve as the parochial elementary schools and Dickinson Trinity has both a junior high school and a high school. Hope Christian Academy is also located in Dickinson. HCA is part of the Evangelical Bible Church. The current principal is Shane Bradley.

Higher education
 Dickinson State University, A public University that offers 51 bachelor's degrees, 4 associate degrees, and 2 certificate programs.

Transportation
Dickinson is served by Dickinson Theodore Roosevelt Regional Airport. United Express provides commercial airline service to Denver. Delta Connection discontinued service to Minneapolis on December 1, 2015

FedEx Express has daily cargo flight service between Theodore Roosevelt Regional Airport (DIK) and Hector International Airport (FAR) in Fargo, ND.  The flights operate Monday through Saturday using Cessna 208B Caravans with Cargomaster cargo pods.

Jefferson Lines offers regional bus service throughout the Midwest and stops at the Paragon Lanes Bowling Alley in Dickinson almost daily throughout the week.

The former Northern Pacific Railway line now owned by Burlington Northern Santa Fe Railway provides only freight service to Dickinson.

Interstate 94 has interchanges in Dickinson at Exits 59, 61, and 64. It also has an I-94 Business Loop between exits 59 and 64. The state route within Dickinson is North Dakota Highway 22 which runs north and south along Main Avenue and Third Avenue. ND 22 has a truck route along Southwest Eighth Street, State Avenue and West Villard Street due to the low bridge for the former Northern Pacific Railway line.

Law enforcement

The Dickinson Police Department employs about 50 full-time sworn police officers and 24 full-time civilian employees, including dispatchers, records staff and animal control.

Media

Print
 The Dickinson Press

Television
Digital
 2.1 KXMA-TV/The CW (ATSC 19-3)
 2.2 KXMA-TV/CBS (ATSC 19-4)
 2.3 KXMA-TV/weather (ATSC 19-5)
 7.1 KQCD-TV/NBC
 7.2 KQCD-TV/Fox
 7.3 KQCD-TV/MeTV
 9.1 KDSE/PBS Prairie Public Broadcasting
 9.2 KDSE/PBS World
 9.3 KDSE/PBS Minnesota Channel
 9.4 KDSE/PBS  Lifelong Learning
 In addition, Bismarck ABC affiliate KBMY is available only on local satellite and cable systems; it was previously simulcast via KXMA-TV on 2.2 until February 2, 2016.

Radio
FM band
 88.1 K201FN – rebroadcasts CSN (Christian)
 89.9   KDPR – North Dakota Public Radio/NPR network (Public radio)
 90.7   KSLS – rebroadcasts KSLT "K-Salt" (Cont. Christian music)
 92.1   KZRX "Z92" (Mainstream Rock)
 93.9   KXDI "I94" (Country)
 95.7   KQLZ "Q-Rock 95" (Classic Rock)
 99.1   KCAD "Roughrider Country" (Country)
 103.3 KPAR-LP – low power broadcaster carrying LifeTalk Radio network (Christian Talk)
 105.7 KDXN "The Mix" (Adult Contemporary)

AM band
 1230 KDIX "Real Country" (Oldies/Classic country)
 1340 KPOK (Country/Talk)
 1410 KDKT "Fox Sports Radio 1410" (Sports/Talk)
 1460 KLTC (Classic country/Talk)

Sites of interest
 Dickinson Dinosaur Museum
 Dickinson Museum Center
 West River Community Center
 West River Ice Center
 Biesiot Activities Center
 Ukrainian Cultural Institute
 Dickinson Area Public Library (originally a Carnegie Library)
 North Dakota Soccer Association headquarters

Sports
 The Dickinson Packers played independent minor league baseball in the Mandak League from 1955 to 1956
 Dickinson Roughriders of North Dakota American Legion Baseball
 Dickinson State University Blue Hawks
 Dickinson High School Midgets
 Trinity High School Titans
 Badlands Big Sticks, summer collegiate baseball team in Independence League Baseball

Notable people

 LaRoy Baird, lived in Dickinson, former member of North Dakota Senate
 Doug Beaudoin, born in Dickinson, former American football safety in the NFL
 Bob Bergloff, born in Dickinson, former ice hockey defenseman
 Byron Dorgan, born in Dickinson, former United States Senator
 Edward Doro, born in Dickinson, poet
 Cole Frenzel (born 1990), former division 1 collegiate and Major league baseball player, current professional outdoor enthusiast
 Clay S. Jenkinson, born in Dickinson, scholar, author, and educator
 Bennie Joppru, born in Dickinson, former tight end in the National Football League
 Douglas Kary, born in Dickinson, member of the Montana Legislature
 Aaron Krauter, born in Dickinson, member of North Dakota Senate
 John S. Lesmeister, born in Dickinson, 30th North Dakota State Treasurer
 Kellan Lutz, born in Dickinson, actor, played Emmett Cullen in Twilight
 Mitch Malloy, born in Dickinson, singer and songwriter
 Ted Nace, raised in Dickinson, writer, publisher, and environmentalist
 Herb Parker (1921–2007), lived in Dickinson, teacher and American football coach at Minot State University
 Malachi Ritscher (1954–2006), born in Dickinson, musician and human rights activist
 George Scherger (1920–2011), born in Dickinson, MLB coach, infielder, and manager
 Dorothy Stickney (1896–1998), born in Dickinson, stage and film actress
 Bill Swain, born in Dickinson, former linebacker for the New York Giants

References

External links

 
 Dickinson Convention and Visitor's Bureau

 
Cities in North Dakota
Dickinson, North Dakota micropolitan area
Cities in Stark County, North Dakota
County seats in North Dakota
Populated places established in 1881
1881 establishments in Dakota Territory